Norman L. Passmore Sr. (April 1, 1915 – March 16, 2003)  was the seventh head football at the Kentucky State University in Frankfort, Kentucky and he held that position for the 1944 season.  His career coaching record at Kentucky State 1–1.

Kentucky State did not field a team in 1943 and only had two games on the schedule in 1944. He also coached the Lexington Dunbar Bearcats from 1951 to around 1967. Passmore was an educator, serving as principal of a school in Kentucky. He also was a veteran of World War II as well as a pastor.

He died in 2003 of a heart attack.

References

External links
 

1915 births
2003 deaths
Kentucky State Thorobreds football coaches
Sportspeople from Columbus, Georgia